Tålamod is a studio album by Swedish pop singer Shirley Clamp released on October 24, 2007.

Track listing
Tålamod     
Ett hus på stranden
Jag tar en annan väg
Aldrig
Kanske är det så
Tystnaden den sårar
Som man bäddar får man ligga
Mot horisonten
Efter allt
Kan inte sova utan dig
Som en saga
Två själar
Trött på att höra  
Även om jag snubblar

Charts

References

2007 albums
Shirley Clamp albums